Republican National Party was a former right-wing Turkish political party.

The party was founded by the members of Nation Party which closed by the court on 27 January 1954. Osman Bölükbaşı with the former members of the Nation Party founded Republican National Party on 10 February 1954 just two weeks after the closure of the former party. Bölükbaşı became the chairman of the party. Even under this unfavorable conditions, in the elections held on 2 May 1954, Republican National Party won 5 seats by the rhetoric and campaigning efforts of Bölükbaşı.

On June 24, 1957, the parliament stripped the Republican Nation Party leader Osman Bölükbaşı of his parliamentary immunity on grounds of "insulting the incorporeal personality of the parliament" and Bölükbaşı was arrested on July 2, on a court decision, which was abolished by another court order on July 23. Two days later, on July 25, Bölükbaşı was once again arrested. When he won a seat at the elections on October 27, along with three more from his party, Bölükbaşı was released on immunity.

On 30 May of the same year Democrat Party government abolished Kırşehir Province, Bölükbaşı’s electoral province. Prime Minister Adnan Menderes explained the reason of statue change as the abnormality of voters' decision in Kırşehir Province in which the percentage of CMP votes was much higher than that of Turkey in general.
(Kırşehir regained its former status on 1 July 1957). Nevertheless Bölükbaşı made a name as an outstanding political opponent of the Democrat Party government with his small party. On 2 July 1957, just after Kırşehir gained its former status, Bölükbaşı was arrested by the accusation of insulting the parliament. Thus he couldn’t campaign for the 1957 elections. However his party increased its votes and Bölükbaşı kept his seat in the elections held on 27 October 1957. One month after the elections he was acquitted.

Merger 
On 17 October 1958 Republican Nation Party was merged with the Turkish Villagers' Party and was named as Republican Peasants' Nation Party.

References

 
Defunct political parties in Turkey
Political parties established in 1954
1954 establishments in Turkey
Political parties disestablished in 1958
Nationalist parties
1958 disestablishments in Turkey